The Montenegro national under-21 handball team represents Montenegro in international handball competitions.

Current squad
This list represents the Montenegro squad at the 2007

Goalkeepers:
Marko Danilović  ( RK Sutjeska)
Dalibor Petković ( RK Lovćen)
Goran Anđelić ( RK Pljevlja)

Wings:
Filip Blečić  ( RK Sutjeska)
Filip Popović ( RK Boka)
Marko Popivoda ( RK Mornar)
Mirza Ramusović ( RK Berane)
Marko Lasica ( RK Lovćen)

Guards:
Janko Kusović ( RK Cepelin)
Veljko Šćepnović ( RK Vrbas)
Vuk Milošević ( Algeciras BM)
Žarko Marković ( FOTEX)
Vasko Ševaljević ( RK Boka)
Ivan Đurković ( RK Partizan)
Žarko Pejović ( RK Crvena Zvezda)
Nebojša Lakić ( RK Željezničar)

Pivotmen:
Andrija Pejović ( RK Lovćen)
Boško Bjelobrković (RK Budućnost)
Boris Kljajević ( RK Mojkovac)

Coaching staff:
Coach: Brano Božović
Assistant Coach: Milan Radović

References

External links 

Handball in Montenegro
Men's national junior handball teams
H